Scilla Gabel (born Gianfranca Gabellini; 4 January 1938) is an Italian film, television and stage actress. She appeared in 50 films between 1954 and 1982.

Career
Born in Rimini, Italy, one of five children, Gabel entered the cinema industry as Sophia Loren's body double. Between 1957 and 1967 she appeared, often as the female lead actress, in dozens of films, but failed to emerge because of the stereotyped roles. Starting from late sixties she focused her activity on stage and television, in which she found most significant roles and critical appreciation.

Personal life
Gabel married Piero Schivazappa in 1968; they had one child.

Father's murder 
On 8 May 1999 Gabel's 87 year-old father Giuseppe Gabellini was murdered. He was landlord to a number of tenants at his villa on the via Campi di Torre Flavia two blocks from Ladispoli's beach, about 35 km west of Rome. One tenant, 65 year old Elisa Santilli owed Gabellini Lit. 900,000 ($785 in 2022) for several months rent, which she refused to pay. Santilli had also refused a Lit. 3,000,000 ($2,820 in 2022) buyout from Gabellini to leave the apartment voluntarily. 

At 10:15 on the morning of Friday, 8 May Gabellini returned to via Campi di Torre Flavi to reason with Santilli one last time before informing her that he had scheduled her eviction by carabiniere for 25 May. After a brief argument at the threshold, during which she accepted the buyout, Santilli returned to her kitchen where she retrieved a large kitchen knife. She sprang at the elderly man and stabbed him in the chest without a word. After Gabellini fell to the floor of the corridor she pounced on his stricken body. There she stabbed him fourteen more times, stopping only after she broke off the tip of her knife in one of her landlord's vertebrae. She then stood back, apparently to watch Gabellini die. 

Gabel's father died at the scene in his daughter's arms. Santilli moved out of the apartment one week later, after being placed on house arrest awaiting trial. She moved 70 km northwest, to Pescia Romana.

Partial filmography

 Tua per la vita (1955) - La sartina dell' Atelier
 Due sosia in allegria (1956)
 Gente felice (1957) - Gina
 Girls of the Night (1958) - Lola
 Legs of Gold (1958) - Gianna
 The White Warrior (1959) - Princess Maria Vorontsova
 Tarzan's Greatest Adventure (1959) - Toni
 Les canailles (1960) - Gina
 Genitori in blue-jeans (1960) - Colette
 Tough Guys (1960) - Josette
 Call Girls of Rome (1960) - Patrizia
 Queen of the Pirates (1960) - Isabella, the Duke's Daughter
 Mill of the Stone Women (1960) - Elfie Wahl
 La grande vallata (1961)
 Les filles sèment le vent (1961) - Kissa
 The Festival Girls (1961) - Nadja
 Mara (1961)
 Three Faces of Sin (1961) - Rossana Stromboli
 Romulus and the Sabines (1961) - Dusia
 Village of Daughters (1962) - Angelina Vimercati
 No Man's Land (1962) - Woman
 Colossus of the Arena (1962) - Thalima
 Sodom and Gomorrah (1962) - Tamar
 La salamandre d'or (1962) - Béatrice
 The Two Colonels (1963) - Iride
 Knights of Terror (1963) - Cristina
 I diavoli di Spartivento (1963)
 Outlaws of Love (1963) - Wilma
 Seven Slaves Against the World (1964) - Claudia
 Corpse for the Lady (1964) - Renata
 The Revenge of Spartacus (1964) - Cinzia
 Una storia di notte (1964) - A German tourist
 Il figlio di Cleopatra (1964) - Livia
 Con rispetto parlando (1965)
 Modesty Blaise (1966) - Melina
 Djurado (1966) - Barbara Donovan
 Target for Killing (1966) - La Tigra
 How to Seduce a Playboy (1966) - Anita Bionda
 Zärtliche Haie (1967) - Zeezee
  (1967) - Molly Pink
 Bastard, Go and Kill (1971) - Susanna

References

External links
 
 

1938 births
Living people
Italian film actresses
Italian stage actresses
Italian television actresses
Accademia Nazionale di Arte Drammatica Silvio D'Amico alumni
People from Rimini
20th-century Italian actresses